Robert Shane Ryan (né Stevenson; March 17, 1987) is an American former professional ice hockey winger. He played for the Anaheim Ducks, Ottawa Senators and Detroit Red Wings in the National Hockey League (NHL). He was drafted second overall by the Mighty Ducks of Anaheim in the 2005 NHL Entry Draft.

He played six seasons with the Ducks before being traded to the Senators in 2013, and one season with Detroit in 2020–21. He has also represented the United States in international and Olympic hockey.

Playing career

Junior
After winning national championships with his minor hockey team, the Los Angeles Junior Kings, Ryan initially committed to playing for the USA Hockey's National Team Development Program at the under-18 level. Despite telling Ontario Hockey League (OHL) teams he would not play major junior, Ryan was selected by the Owen Sound Attack seventh overall in the 2003 OHL Selection Draft. He was ultimately persuaded to play for the team and immediately began his major junior career with a 39-point rookie campaign in 2003–04. After improving to 89 points the following season, Ryan was drafted second overall by the Mighty Ducks of Anaheim in the 2005 NHL Entry Draft.

Professional

Anaheim Ducks 

Ryan closed out his OHL career after the 2006–07 season. Upon elimination in the playoffs, he was assigned by the Ducks to the Portland Pirates of the American Hockey League (AHL) for the final eight games of the 2006–07 AHL season. He then started the 2007–08 season with the Ducks, scoring his first career NHL goal in his debut against the Los Angeles Kings at The O2 arena in London, England. Ryan was, however, sent back to Portland after four games. He was recalled on March 7, 2008, when Corey Perry's leg injury sidelined him for the remainder of the regular season.

In the following 2008–09 season, Ryan once again made the opening roster, but was to be sent down to the Ducks' new AHL affiliate, the Iowa Chops, due to salary cap issues. He was recalled during the season and recorded a natural hat trick, the first hat trick of his NHL career, on January 8, 2009, against Los Angeles at the Staples Center in a 4–3 loss. In doing so, he became the first rookie in Ducks history to record a hat trick, it being the fastest of any player in the 15-year history of the franchise. On March 22, 2009, Ryan broke the franchise rookie point record set by Dustin Penner after tallying two assists for his 46th point in an Anaheim win over the Phoenix Coyotes.

On April 22, 2009, Ryan was named a finalist for the Calder Memorial Trophy, along with Steve Mason of the Columbus Blue Jackets and Kris Versteeg of the Chicago Blackhawks—Mason ultimately won the award.

On September 14, 2010, just prior to the 2010–11 season, the Ducks signed Ryan to a five-year, $25.5 million contract extension. On December 12, during a game against the Minnesota Wild, left-handed captain Mikko Koivu stole Ryan's stick while in the Ducks' offensive zone, whereupon the right-handed Ryan picked up Koivu's stick and scored a goal with it.  The play was later named number one on TSN's SportsCentre'''s "Top 10 NHL Oddities" list.

On November 24, 2012, Ryan participated in Operation Hat Trick, a charity hockey game at Boardwalk Hall in Atlantic City to raise money for Hurricane Sandy victims.

 Ottawa Senators 
On July 5, 2013, Ryan was acquired by the Ottawa Senators in exchange for forwards Jakob Silfverberg, Stefan Noesen and a first-round draft pick in 2014 (used to select Nick Ritchie). Ryan registered 23 goals in his first season with the Senators, a season cut short by injury—on March 27, 2014, it was announced via Twitter that he would undergo season-ending sports hernia surgery to repair an injury he had been dealing with since November 2013.

On October 2, 2014, the Senators announced they had signed Ryan to a seven-year, $50.75 million contract extension, a deal that would keep him with the team through the 2021–22 season. Ryan responded with his first All-Star Game appearance after being selected to represent Team Foligno at the 2015 NHL All-Star Game in Columbus, Ohio, on January 25, 2015.

Ryan struggled during the 2016–17 regular season earning only 25 points in 62 games while also coping with injuries. However, he proved to be an asset to the team in the 2017 Stanley Cup playoffs, scoring four goals in six games during the first round of the playoffs against the Boston Bruins, helping the Senators to move onto the second round against the New York Rangers. He finished the playoffs with six goals and nine assists as the Senators were eliminated in overtime in game seven of the Eastern Conference Finals against the Pittsburgh Penguins.

In the 2019–20 season, Ryan missed approximately three months while attending an NHL player assistance program. It was later revealed by Ryan that he had entered the program due to ongoing struggles with alcohol abuse. He returned to NHL action on February 25, 2020, in an away game versus the Nashville Predators. In his first post-rehab home game two days later, Ryan made headlines by scoring his fifth career hat trick. On September 7, Ryan was awarded the Bill Masterton Memorial Trophy by the NHL for perseverance and dedication to hockey.

On September 25, 2020, Ryan was placed on unconditional waivers for the purpose of buying out the final two years remaining on his contract with the Senators. The following day, Ryan cleared waivers and became a free agent for the first time in his career.

Detroit Red Wings
On October 9, 2020, the first day of free agency, Ryan signed a one-year, $1 million contract with the Detroit Red Wings.

Ryan scored his first goal for the Detroit Red Wings in a 4-2 win against the Carolina Hurricanes on January 16, 2021.

He has not played since 2020–21 season.

International play
Ryan played for the United States at the 2006 World Junior Championships, where the team lost to Finland in the bronze medal game, earning them a fourth-place finish.

Four years later, Ryan was selected to Team USA for the 2010 Winter Olympics in Vancouver on January 1, 2010. He scored the U.S.' first goal of the tournament at 18:59 of the first period in their opening match against then-Ducks teammate Jonas Hiller of Switzerland. Team USA eventually lost to Canada in the gold medal game, earning Ryan and the Americans a silver medal. He scored one goal and one assist in the tournament.

In 2014, Ryan was passed over by the U.S. Olympic Hockey Team despite his strong play during the first half of the 2013–14 season. This snub created somewhat of a controversy surrounding Ryan's play and the U.S. Olympic Team.

Personal life
Ryan was born Robert Shane Stevenson, Jr. in Cherry Hill, New Jersey, and grew up in Collingswood, attending Queen of Heaven for grade school.

On October 29, 1997, Ryan's father, Bob Stevenson, badly beat Ryan's mother, Melody, in a drunken rage, leaving her hospitalized with four broken ribs, a skull fracture and a punctured lung. Ryan's father was charged with attempted murder and jumped bail, fleeing to Canada. His wife later forgave him and she and Bobby joined him in Canada, living under assumed names. Stevenson had picked the surname Ryan after watching Saving Private Ryan'', and his son followed it. The family eventually relocated to El Segundo, California so that Ryan could play in an elite youth hockey feeder system. In February 2000, Ryan's father, who had been supporting the family as a professional gambler, was arrested at home by the United States Marshals Service.

Ryan played in the 2001 Quebec International Pee-Wee Hockey Tournament with the Los Angeles Junior Kings minor ice hockey team.

Since his last NHL season, Ryan now runs a Senators based podcast called 'Coming in Hot'.

Career statistics

Regular season and playoffs

International

Awards and honors

References

External links

 

1987 births
Living people
American expatriate ice hockey players in Canada
American expatriate ice hockey players in Sweden
American men's ice hockey right wingers
Anaheim Ducks draft picks
Anaheim Ducks players
Bill Masterton Memorial Trophy winners
Detroit Red Wings players
Ice hockey players from New Jersey
Ice hockey players at the 2010 Winter Olympics
Iowa Stars players
Medalists at the 2010 Winter Olympics
Mora IK players
National Hockey League All-Stars
National Hockey League first-round draft picks
Olympic silver medalists for the United States in ice hockey
Ottawa Senators players
Owen Sound Attack players
People from Cherry Hill, New Jersey
People from Collingswood, New Jersey
Portland Pirates players
Sportspeople from Camden County, New Jersey